The 2023 Lamar Lady Cardinals softball team represents Lamar University during the 2023 NCAA Division I softball season. The Lady Cardinals play their home games at Lamar Softball Complex and are led by fifth-year head coach Amy Hooks. The 2023 season marks Lamar's return to the Southland Conference following one season as a member of the Western Athletic Conference.

Preseason

Early signing
On September 2, 2022, Lamar announced that seven new players would join the team for the 2023 season.

National signing day
On November 10, 2022, National signing day, Lamar announced that ten additional new players would join the team for the 2023 season.

Southland Conference Coaches Poll
The Southland Conference Coaches Poll was released on January 26, 2023. Lamar was picked to finish sixth in the Southland Conference with 49 votes.

Preseason All-Southland team
No Lady Cardinals were named to conference preseason teams.

First Team
Crislyne Moreno (MCNS, SO, 1st Base)
Caleigh Cross  (MCNS, SR, 2nd Base)
Jil Poullard (MCNS, JR, 3rd Base)
Maddie Watson (SELA, SO, Shortstop)
Bailey Krolczyk (SELA, JR, Catcher)
Kaylee Lopez (MCNS, SR, Utility)
Audrey Greely (SELA, JR, Designated Player)
Laney Roos (NSU, JR, Outfielder)
Alayis Seneca (MCNS, SR, Outfielder)
Cam Goodman (SELA, JR, Outfielder)
Ashley Vallejo (MCNS, JR, Pitcher)
Bronte Rhoden (NSU, SR, Pitcher)

Second Team
Sydney Hoyt (TAMUCC, JR, 1st Base)
Madison Rayner (SELA, SR, 2nd Base)
Haylie Savage (HCU, SO, 3rd Base)
Ryleigh Mata (UIW, SO, Shortstop)
Tristin Court (NSU, JR, Catcher)
Melise Gossen (NICH, SR, Utility)
Chloe Gomez (MCNS, JR, Designated Player)
Alexa Poche (NICH, JR, Outfielder)
Makenzie Chaffin (NSU, JR, Outfielder)
Bailie Ragsdale (NSU, SO, Outfielder)
Lyndie Swanson (HCU, JR, Pitcher)
Siarah Galvan  (TAMUCC, SO, Pitcher)

Roster

Schedule and results

Schedule Source:
*Rankings are based on the team's current ranking in the NFCA/USA Softball poll.

References

Lamar
Lamar Lady Cardinals softball
Lamar Lady Cardinals softball